The Domestics is a 2018 American post-apocalyptic action horror film directed and written by Mike P. Nelson. The film stars Kate Bosworth and Tyler Hoechlin.

The film was released on June 28, 2018, by Orion Classics.

Plot 
The global ruling class of humanity conducts a catastrophic chemical weapons attack on the American populace to 'reset' society and the overflowing population. The surviving percentage of America has divided into two groups: the Gangs who control territory and go by their respective themes; The Gamblers, Sheets, Plowboys, Nailers, and Cherries, and the Domestics; those not affiliated with the Gangs who wish to live in peace and have not given in to their violent nature.

Domestic couple Mark and Nina West are traveling to Milwaukee to see Nina’s parents while dealing with the decision of getting a divorce before everything happened. While scavenging for supplies they are met by another survivor Nathan Wood and his son Steven who together escape from a small group of Nailers. Mark and Nina are invited to Nathan’s home to meet his wife and daughter but it ends in tragedy after discovering they were fed human meat and a surviving Nailer followed them, injuring Nina causing her and Mark to flee leaving the Woods behind where the Nailer kills Nathan’s wife and daughter. Nathan kills the Nailer but swears revenge and calls up some of his Plowboy contacts on his CB Radio about the Wests.

The Wests make it to an abandoned house unaware they’ve been followed by a deserter Cherry named Betsy who escaped Plowboys’ slave captivity and has developed a fascination for Nina. Mark goes looking for supplies but is later held at gunpoint by William Cunningham, a flamboyant madman, and forced to fight against his large slave after he discovers William has beaten and captured Nathan and Steven who caught up to the Wests. Nina awakes, finds a bottle of alcohol, puts on a Heavy Metal record Mark left for her and begins drunk dancing while Mark fights the slave. He eventually wins the fight and kills a fleeing William. The slave is freed by Mark out of sympathy for William mistreating him earlier and Nathan departs, forgiving Mark and giving up his quest for vengeance wishing Mark and Nina good luck.

Mark reunites with Nina at the house, who finds an old car similar to what Mark once owned when they first began dating. The two rekindle their passion but are unaware the car belongs to Gamblers who arrive and capture them. They're forced into a game of Russian Roulette with Mark taking the bullet in the shoulder for Nina. Nina makes their escape after grabbing a gun from a distracted Gambler’s boot and stealing a car, finally making it to her parents' house to treat Mark's wounds and reunite with her parents.

Nina learns sadly from the neighbors her parents had died earlier, Mark awakens later and discovers her father’s prized Wildey Hunter Pistol has been stolen. The Gamblers have caught up to them along with all the other Gangs and Betsy. A showdown begins resulting in a violent and bloody battle with all sides suffering massive casualties. In the end, Nina and Mark win the fight, the Gangs retreat with their remaining members, and Betsy returns Nina’s wedding ring to Mark that Nina had left at the abandoned house remarking "for her" after which she's shot from behind in the head with Nina killing Betsy's killer afterward. Nina finds her father's gun at a neighbor's home who was a Gambler spy, later revealed to be killed by a neighbor's kid who is revealed to be part of a rumored gang of young killers Nathan mentioned earlier.

Mark and Nina take a moment to catch their breath at Nina's parents' house and embrace each other. They later pack up and leave turning on the radio with Crazy Al, a DJ who has been sending broadcast updates about the current state of America warning the Gangs and other survivors not to mess with Mark and Nina.

Cast
 Tyler Hoechlin as Mark West
 Kate Bosworth as Nina Monroe West
 Lance Reddick as Nathan Wood
 Sonoya Mizuno as Betsy
 Dana Gourrier as Wanda
 Jacinte Blankenship as Theresa Wood 
 
 Thomas Francis Murphy as Plowboy Jim
 David Dastmalchian as Willy Cunningham
 Lee Perkins as Dean the Nailer
 Kaden Washington Lewis as Steven Wood 
 Mikaela Kimani Armstrong as Bella Wood

Production 
On March 24, 2016, it was announced that Mike P. Nelson would direct the post-apocalyptic thriller film The Domestics from his own script, for Metro-Goldwyn-Mayer and Hollywood Gang Productions. Gianni Nunnari and Shannon Gaulding would produce the film. On September 8, 2016, Kate Bosworth and Tyler Hoechlin were cast to star in the film. The movie was filmed in Louisiana.

Stunt performer Deven MacNair filed an EEOC anti-discrimination lawsuit against producers of the film over an incident of "wigging", the practice of using a stunt performer that does not match either the sex or race of the actor, which is against SAG-AFTRA rules.

Release
In May 2018, Orion Classics acquired distribution rights to the film and set it for a June 28, 2018, release.

Reception
The film has received favorable reviews from critics.

Robbie Collin of The Telegraph gave it a positive review and wrote: "It's all good grim fun, with a visceral kick."

References

External links
 

2018 films
2018 horror films
American horror thriller films
Orion Pictures films
Vertigo Films films
American post-apocalyptic films
American science fiction horror films
Films scored by Nathan Barr
Films set in Milwaukee
2010s English-language films
2010s American films